Highway 126 (AR 126, Ark. 126, and Hwy. 126) is a designation for two north–south state highways in Baxter County, Arkansas. A southern route of  runs from Buffalo City north to US Route 62/US Route 412 (US 62/US 412) near Mountain Home. A second route of  begins at US 62/US 412 in Gassville and runs north to Highway 5/Highway 178 at Midway.

Route description

Buffalo City to Mountain Home
Highway 126 begins near the Marion County line at Buffalo City, situated at the confluence of the Buffalo River and White River. It heads north to Buford and before it meets US 62/US 412, where it terminates near Mountain Home. The average daily traffic counts from the Arkansas State Highway and Transportation Department (AHTD) for 2010 show that a maximum of about 1500 vehicles per day (VPD) use the northern portion of Highway 126 nearest US 62/US 412, with the count dropping to around 660 VPD for portions further south.

The highway passes the Buford School Building, listed on the National Register of Historic Places.

Gassville to Midway
Highway 126 begins at US 62/US 412 (Main Street) in Gassville and runs north to serve as the northern terminus of Highway 345. The route exits Gassville to the north, passing through Whiteville and forming a concurrency with Highway 178 near Monkey Run. This overlap continues north past Ozark Regional Airport to Midway, where the route terminates. Highway 178 follows Highway 5 briefly north before turning west toward Bull Shoals-White River State Park.

Traffic counts from the AHTD in 2010 indicate that the average daily traffic volume on this segment of Highway 126 ranges from 3800 VPD near Gassville to 2800 VPD at the northern terminus.

Major intersections

|-
| align=center colspan=5 | Highway 126 begins at Gassville
|-

See also

References

External links

126
Transportation in Baxter County, Arkansas